Laurence Irving may refer to:

 Laurence Irving (dramatist) (1871–1914), English actor, dramatist and novelist
 Laurence Irving (physiologist) (1895–1979), American physiologist
 Laurence Irving (set designer) (1897–1988), English set designer, nephew of the dramatist

See also 

 J. Lawrence Irving (born 1935), U.S. federal judge